The Real World: St. Thomas is the twenty-seventh season of MTV's reality television series The Real World, which focuses on a group of diverse strangers living together for several months in a different city each season, as cameras follow their lives and interpersonal relationships. It is the only season of The Real World to be filmed in the Caribbean, and the second season set in the United States to be filmed outside of the contiguous United States after The Real World: Hawaii.

The season featured a cast of seven people who lived in a house on Hassel Island. St. Thomas and Hassel Island in the U.S. Virgin Islands were first reported as the location for the 27th season in a February 2012 article on the website St. Thomas Blog. Production started from March to May 2012, and the season premiered on June 27 of that year, consisting of 12 episodes.

Assignment
Most seasons of The Real World, beginning with its fifth season, have included the assignment of a season-long group job or task to the housemates, continued participation in which has been mandatory to remain part of the cast since the Back to New York season. The cast worked at Coral World Ocean Park for their season assignment.

The residence
The cast lived on Hassel Island, almost all of which is property of the Virgin Islands National Park, with a small area owned by the Virgin Islands Port Authority, and a few private residences. The season residence was located on an isolated estate consisting of three houses totaling approximately 15,000 square feet, a quarter mile across the bay from Charlotte Amalie, St. Thomas, the capital and largest city of the US Virgin Islands. The property was purchased by a local businessman in 2007 and extensively renovated in early 2010 by local architect Kevin Qualls. Its sales listing prior to filming indicates that it houses three master suites with unobstructed views of Charlotte Amalie harbor, an open terrace bordering the living room 100 feet from the harbor and a swimming pool that includes a natural cascade from ancient rock outcroppings. The property also includes two 1,200 square foot West Indian-inspired guest cottages North and South of the main building, a front lawn facing the harbor that can hold up to 225 guests and a new dock and helipad. The cast had access to motor boats that would take them back and forth from Hassel Island to Charlotte Amalie.

Cast

 Age at time of filming

Duration of cast

Episodes

After filming
The Real World: St. Thomas Reunion aired on September 12, 2012, following the season finale. Maria Menounos hosted, and featured the entire cast, as they discussed their time during filming and their lives since the show ended.

Since filming ended, Laura returned to Nebraska, where she enjoys fishing with her cousin, while LaToya returned to Virginia, and stated that she kept in touch with her boyfriend while living in St. Thomas, and enjoys driving her Ford Mustang. Robb returned to Pennsylvania, where he plans to take online classes for a business degree. Marie returned to Staten Island, where she is undecided about her future plans, while Swift keeps busy with magazine photo shoots, and though he originally pursued interest in sports medicine, he is now pursuing a law degree. Trey returned to Baltimore, where he engages in public and motivational speaking activities at local high schools and colleges, and plays flag football for fun. Brandon returned to Massachusetts, where he fluctuates between sleeping at friends' houses and staying with his dad, as well as continuing electrical work and booking appearances. Laura, Marie, Robb and Trey each participated in The Challenge: Battle of the Seasons in Bodrum, Turkey, after filming ended.

Among the topics discussed was the bitter breakup involving Marie and Robb over a text message and a lack of communication on Robb's part, as well as Marie's drunken behavior and her reputation as a "bad bitch." The complicated relationship between Trey and Laura was also discussed, including Trey's revelation that he failed to re-establish his relationship with Chelsea after filming ended. Tensions erupted when Marie's mean-spirited behavior with fellow housemates and Trey's treatment of Laura were discussed, including LaToya getting physical with Swift. Brandon discussed his struggle with substance abuse, sobriety and the failed drug test that resulted in his eviction from the house, and Menounos questioned his attitude regarding his lifestyle and sobriety. Some of the pranks and antics were also discussed.

On November 1, 2012, Brandon Swift was arrested and charged with disorderly conduct.

In 2016, Laura Waller gave birth to her daughter, Aveya Rian Waller. Her second daughter was born in July 2019.

In 2019, Marie Roda appeared on the third season of Ex on the Beach.

The Challenge

Challenges in bold indicate the cast member was a finalist on the Challenge.

References

External links
Official site at MTV
Real World: St. Thomas Trailer. MTV.com

St. Thomas
Television shows filmed in the United States Virgin Islands
2012 American television seasons